Pribišje (in older sources Perbišje, earlier Perbische) is a small settlement in the hills north of Semič in Slovenia. The Municipality of Semič is included in the Southeast Slovenia Statistical Region. The area is also part of the historical region of Lower Carniola.

References

External links
Pribišje at Geopedia

Populated places in the Municipality of Semič